Ballarat North Workshops is a railway systems engineering facility located in the provincial city of Ballarat, Victoria, Australia. They are located in the suburb of Soldiers Hill on Creswick Road, and occupy 5.5 hectares of land beside the junction of the Mildura and Serviceton railway lines.

History
The workshops were opened in April 1917 by the main rail operator in Victoria, the Victorian Railways. They were opened in response to political pressures from provincial groups for decentralisation, with the Victorian Railways preferring the cheaper option of expanding the existing Newport Workshops in suburban Melbourne. The main work carried out was repairs and maintenance of existing wagons and locomotives, but from 1919-22 thirteen new steam locomotives were also built - eight DD class (1038 - 1042, 1050 - 1052) and five A2 class  (1073 - 1077) steam locomotives were also built. By the 1960s goods wagons were also being built, and by the 1980s work was also being carried out on Melbourne suburban electric multiple units.

The 1980s were also a time of restructuring, with run down facilities replaced and modernised, but a large number of the 540 employees were made redundant. With the breakup of the Victorian Railways the workshops passed to the State Transport Authority and then the Public Transport Corporation. With privatisation the workshops were sold to Alstom Australia in 1999 for $7 million. In 2005 Alstom sold their Australian and New Zealand operations to United Group, but leased the workshops at Ballarat to United Group.

Operations

Today workshops provide maintenance services to a number of Victorian Railway operators and employ 150 staff. Work includes manufacturing, reconditioning and component overhaul work for Melbourne's train and tram networks, V/Line Passenger, Pacific National and CFCL Australia.

Recent work include the work on suburban trains for Connex Melbourne, including the refurbishment of Comeng and Hitachi trains, as well as the fitout of new Alstom X'Trapolis 100 trains imported from France. It has also fitted Train Protection & Warning System equipment to the V/Line fleet, and constructed 61 new 100-tonne bulk grain hoppers for Chicago Freight Car Leasing Australia.

References

External links
 Photos of the workshops today

Buildings and structures in Ballarat
Railway workshops in Victoria (Australia)